Sequals is a comune (municipality) in the Province of Pordenone in the Italian region Friuli-Venezia Giulia, located about  northwest of Trieste and about  northeast of Pordenone.

Sequals borders the following municipalities: Arba, Cavasso Nuovo, Meduno, Pinzano al Tagliamento, Spilimbergo, Travesio.

People
Stefano Balassone (1943), tv producer and writer 
Primo Carnera (1906 - 1967), boxer

Twin towns
 Ripa Teatina, Italy

References

External links

Official website

Cities and towns in Friuli-Venezia Giulia